Sébastien Viars (born 24 June 1971) is a former French rugby union footballer. He was nicknamed "The Compass". He played as a centre and as a wing.

Viars was born at Aurillac.  He played at Stade Aurillacois (1989/90-1991/92), CA Brive (1992/93-1997/98), where he won the Cup of France, in 1995/96, Stade français Paris (1998/99), winning once more the Cup of France, and ASM Clermont (1999/2000-2005/06), where he would finish his career. He won the Heineken Cup, in 1997, with CA Brive, scoring an anthological try in the 28–9 win over Leicester Tigers, from England.

Even in a short international career, he's usually considered one of the best French players of his generation. Viars held 17 caps for France, from 1992 to 1997, scoring 9 tries, 17 penalties and 17 conversions, 127 points in aggregate. He played two times at the Five Nations, in 1992 and 1995, scoring 4 tries, 6 conversions and 4 penalties, 41 points in aggregate. He scored a record of 26 points, 2 tries, 5 conversions and 2 penalties, in the 44–12 win over Ireland, at 21 March 1992. He was also one of the top try scorers of the competition with 3 tries.

Viars was selected for the 1995 Rugby World Cup finals, playing a single game, in the 54–18 win over Côte d'Ivoire and scoring a try.

Viars wasn't called again for the National Team since 1997, when he was only 26 years old.

References

External links
Sébastien Viars International Statistics

1971 births
Living people
French rugby union players
Stade Français players
CA Brive players
ASM Clermont Auvergne players
Rugby union centres
Rugby union wings
France international rugby union players
People from Aurillac
Sportspeople from Cantal